Love bombing is an attempt to influence a person by demonstrations of attention and affection. It can be used in different ways and for either positive or negative purposes. Psychologists have identified love bombing as a possible part of a cycle of abuse and have warned against it. It has also been described as psychological manipulation in order to create a feeling of unity within a group against a society perceived as hostile. In 2011, clinical psychologist Oliver James advocated love bombing in his book Love Bombing: Reset Your Child's Emotional Thermostat, as a means for parents to rectify emotional problems in their children.

Definition and analysis
The expression "love bombing" was coined by members of the Unification Church of the United States during the 1970s and was also used by members of the Family International.  Psychology professor Margaret Singer reported on the concept. In her 1996 book, Cults in Our Midst, she writes:

Abusive relationships

Modern social media can intensify the effect of love bombing since it gives the abuser nearly constant contact and communication with the victim.  One of the signs of love bombing in the start of a relationship is intense attention during a short period of time and pressure for very rapid commitment.

Psychologist Dale Archer identifies the phases of love bombing with the acronym IDD: "Intense Idealization, Devaluation, Discard  (Repeat)", and the process of identifying this behavior pattern as SLL: "Stop, Look, and Listen", after which breaking off contact with the abuser can become more possible by also seeking support from family and friends.

Another sign of love bombing is  being intensely showered with affection, gifts, and promises for the future with the predator so that the victim feels or is made to believe that all this is a sign of "love at first sight". Since such signs of affection and affirmation may meet felt needs and not look harmful at the surface, the excitement of such a new relationship often does not appear as cause for alarm. However, after the initial excitement, when the victim shows interest or care about anything beyond their new partner, the manipulator may show anger, passive-aggressive behavior, or accuse the victims of selfishness. If the victim does not comply to demands, the devaluation stage begins: the abuser withdraws all affection or positive reinforcement and instead punishes the victim with whatever they feel is appropriate—shouting, beratement, mind games, silent treatment, or even physical abuse.

An article in Cosmopolitan explains:

The expression has been used to describe the tactics used by pimps and gang members to control their victims.

Benign occurrences
Excessive attention and affection does not constitute love bombing if there is no intent or pattern of further abuse.  Archer explains: 

British author and psychologist Oliver James recommended love bombing as a technique for parents to help their troubled children. He described it as, "dedicating one-on-one time spoiling and lavishing your child with love, and, within reason, pandering to their every wish."  In 2011 Heidi Scrimgeour, a reporter for The Daily Express, tried the technique with her son and reported:

See also

References

Unification Church controversies
Unification Church neologisms